Anathix is a genus of moths of the family Noctuidae.

Species
 Anathix aggressa (Smith, 1907)
 Anathix immaculata (Morrison, 1875)
 Anathix puta (Grote & Robinson, 1868)
 Anathix ralla (Grote & Robinson, 1868)

References
 Anathix at Markku Savela's Lepidoptera and Some Other Life Forms
 Natural History Museum Lepidoptera genus database

Cuculliinae
Noctuoidea genera